Sekope Kepu (born 5 February 1986) is an Australian professional rugby union player. He is a prop and currently plays for Moana Pasifika in Super Rugby. He has previously played for Australian club New South Wales Waratahs, the French club Bordeaux, and London Irish. He also plays for Australia's Wallabies in international matches. Kepu made his international debut for Australia in 2008 and has been a regular in match-day squads ever since, now having played over 100 tests. Kepu is the most-capped prop to ever play for the Wallabies and is also one of the most-capped rugby players in history.

Early life 
Kepu was born in Sydney, Australia, to Tongan parents, but his family relocated to Auckland while he was still a youngster. He began playing rugby with Tamaki Rugby Football Club Under 7s and attended school in the Auckland suburb Glen Innes.

Kepu captained the Wesley College first XV from the number eight position in 2004 before switching to the front row with the New Zealand under-19s in 2005. He represented New Zealand at under 17, 19 and 21 levels.

Rugby Union career 

Between 2005 and 2007, Kepu was a member of the wider training group for the Chiefs, and was a standout player for Counties Manukau in the Air New Zealand Cup in 2006. A broken collarbone ended his 2007 season and saw him end the year without a Super 14 contract.

Kepu moved back to Sydney at the age of 21 to play for the NSW Waratahs. He made his Super Rugby debut  against the Highlanders in Dunedin, playing as the starting loosehead after Wallabies prop  was ruled out due to a head knock.

In June 2008, Kepu played for Australia A in the 2008 Pacific Nations Cup. He was selected for the Wallabies on the 2008 and 2009 Spring tours, and made his test debut on 8 November 2008, against Italy at Padova. He gained two more test caps from the bench on those tours but then waited for more than a year to make another test appearance.

Kepu had a strong season at the Waratahs in 2011 with 13 Super Rugby appearances, including 12 starts.

In the 2011 Tri Nations Series, Kepu became the first choice loosehead prop for the Wallabies after Benn Robinson was ruled out of the entire campaign due to a knee injury. Kepu started in all four tests and cemented his position. Australia won the 2011 Tri Nations cup.

Kepu was a key player for Australia at the 2011 Rugby World Cup, starting in six of the seven matches that the Wallabies played.

In March 2013, he re-signed with Australian Rugby to commit to the Wallabies and Waratahs for a further two years. Since then, Kepu has played at tighthead rather than loosehead prop for the Wallabies. Kepu's re-signing led to him starting in all three knockout rounds of the 2015 Rugby World Cup, but he was ill-disciplined in the final against New Zealand, on 31 October 2015, which Australia lost 17–34.

Kepu's third Super Rugby try against the Chiefs in round 15 of 2017 was well received by the press. He had an excellent 2017 season, being one of the best-performing Wallabies of the year.  During his 90th test, Kepu ended the season being red-carded against Scotland on 25 November 2017. In the 39th minute of the test, he shoulder-charged Scottish flanker Hamish Watson's head, with Australia leading 12–10 at the time. Australia failed to perform well with Kepu off the field, losing 53–24. Kepu became the second Wallaby to be sent off in that decade, teammate Tevita Kuridrani having been sent off in 2013.

In October 2018, Kepu became the first prop to make 100 appearances for Australia, appearing against New Zealand in a 37–20 loss.

On 6 May 2019, it was announced that he had signed for London Irish in the Gallagher Premiership. On 8 February 2021 it was confirmed that he had left the club for personal reasons.

Kepu is currently playing for Counties Manukau in the 2021 NPC, and will captain Moana Pasifika for the 2022 Super Rugby Pacific Competition.

References

External links
 

1986 births
Australian rugby union players
Australian sportspeople of Tongan descent
Australian expatriate sportspeople in England
Australia international rugby union players
New Zealand rugby union players
New Zealand expatriate sportspeople
New South Wales Waratahs players
Counties Manukau rugby union players
Rugby union props
Australian emigrants to New Zealand
Rugby union players from Sydney
Living people
Union Bordeaux Bègles players
Australian expatriate rugby union players
Australian expatriate sportspeople in France
Expatriate rugby union players in France
Moana Pasifika players
New South Wales Country Eagles players
London Irish players